Live at Mississippi Studios is live album recorded by Amanda Richards at Mississippi Studios in Portland, Oregon, in 2006. The album includes songs from Not Always Sexy as well as several that appeared on Who Has Your Heart. She performed the concert with the cellist and guitar player George Turner who also helped mix and master the recordings.

Track listing

All songs written and performed by Amanda Richards, except where noted.

 "Tommy"
 "Home, I'm on My Way"
 "Here I Am"
 "I'm Sure You'd Know"
 "I Love You More (When I'm All Alone)"
 "Yesterday Is Here" (Tom Waits)
 "It's Already Over"
 "Who Has Your Heart"
 "I Want You"
 "Crossfire"
 "Diamonds and Rust" (Joan Baez)
 "Cookies and Whiskey"

Personnel

 Amanda Richards – guitar, vocals
 George Turner – cello, lead guitar, harmonics, backing vocals

Production

 Amanda Richards – co-producer
 George Turner – co-producer, engineer

External links

2006 live albums